Joseph P. Cutting (January 20, 1885 – ?) was an American college football player and coach. He earned All-Western honors as a Halfback at the University of Minnesota in 1905 and later played at North Dakota State University under head coach Gil Dobie. He served as head football coach at NDSU in 1922.

Head coaching record

College

References

1885 births
Year of death missing
Minnesota Golden Gophers football players
North Dakota State Bison football coaches
North Dakota State Bison football players
Washington Huskies football coaches
High school football coaches in North Dakota
People from Sleepy Eye, Minnesota
Players of American football from Minnesota